The 2004 Summer Paralympics medal table is a list of National Paralympic Committees (NPCs) ranked by the number of gold medals won by their athletes during the 2004 Summer Paralympics, held in Athens, Greece, from September 17 to 28, 2004. Athletes from 75 countries has won at least one medal, leaving 61 countries without a medal.

Medal table

The ranking in this table is based on information provided by the International Paralympic Committee (IPC) and is consistent with IPC convention in its published medal tables. By default, the table is ordered by the number of gold medals the athletes from a nation have won (in this context, a "nation" is an entity represented by a National Paralympic Committee). The number of silver medals is taken into consideration next and then the number of bronze medals. If nations are still tied, equal ranking is given and they are listed alphabetically by IPC country code.

References

See also
 2004 Summer Olympics medal table

External links
International Paralympic Committee

Medal count
2004

fr:Jeux paralympiques d'été de 2004#Tableau des médailles